Mr. Holmes is a 2015 British-American mystery film directed by Bill Condon, based on Mitch Cullin's 2005 novel A Slight Trick of the Mind, and featuring the character Sherlock Holmes. The film stars Ian McKellen as Sherlock Holmes, Laura Linney as his housekeeper Mrs. Munro and Milo Parker as her son Roger. Set primarily during his retirement in Sussex, the film follows a 93-year-old Holmes who struggles to recall the details of his final case because his mind is slowly deteriorating.

Principal photography began on 5 July 2014, in London. The film was screened out of competition at the 65th Berlin International Film Festival and had its premiere on 7 February 2015.

The film was released in British cinemas on 19 June 2015, and in the United States on 17 July 2015.

Plot
In 1947, the long-retired Sherlock Holmes, aged 93, lives in a rural Sussex farmhouse with his widowed housekeeper Mrs Munro and her young son Roger. Having just returned from a trip to Hiroshima, Holmes starts to use a prickly ash plant he acquired there to try to improve his failing memory. Unhappy about Watson's fictionalisation of his last case, The Adventure of the Dove Grey Glove, he hopes to write his own account, but has trouble recalling the events. As Holmes spends time with Roger, showing him how to take care of the bees in the farmhouse's apiary, he comes to appreciate Roger's curiosity and intelligence and develops a paternal liking for him.

Over time, Roger's prodding helps Holmes remember the case (shown in flashbacks); he knows he must have failed somehow, as it resulted in his retirement from the detective business. Almost 30 years earlier, after the First World War had ended and Watson had married and left Baker Street, Thomas Kelmot approached Holmes to find out why his wife Ann had become estranged from him after suffering two miscarriages. Holmes followed Ann around London and observed her seemingly preparing to murder her husband – forging cheques in her husband's name and cashing them, confirming the details of his will, buying poison, paying a man, and checking train schedules. Holmes, however, deduced her true intentions: to have gravestones made for her and her miscarried children (the man she paid was a stonemason) and then kill herself. Confronting her, Holmes confessed he had the same feelings of loneliness and isolation, but his intellectual pursuits sufficed for him. Ann asked Holmes if they could share the burden of their loneliness together. Holmes was tempted, but instead advised her to return to her husband. She poured the poison on the ground, thanked Holmes, and departed. Holmes later learned that Ann succeeded in killing herself by stepping in front of an oncoming train. Blaming himself, he retired and fell into a deep depression. Watson briefly returns to care for him and, discovering the details of the case, rewrites the tragedy into a success.

A second series of flashbacks recounts Holmes' recent trip to Japan, where he met a supposed admirer named Tamiki Umezaki who had told him of the benefits of prickly ash. In fact, Umezaki brought Holmes to Japan in order to confront him. Years before, Umezaki's father had gone to England on business and never returned; he had sent a letter explaining that Holmes had persuaded him to remain there and forget his family in Japan. To Umezaki's disappointment, Holmes told him bluntly that his father probably just wanted a new life for himself and that he had never met the man.

In the present, Mrs Munro grows discontent with her work as Holmes becomes infirm and burdensome to look after. His closeness to her son Roger is another source of tension, as the boy is becoming dissatisfied with his family's lowly status and increasingly distant from his barely literate mother. Mrs Munro accepts a job at a hotel in Portsmouth, and plans to take Roger to work there as well. Roger is unenthused by the prospect of hotel drudgery and unwilling to leave Holmes, and says as much to his mother. Later, Holmes discovers Roger lying unconscious in the garden, covered in insect stings. As the boy is rushed to hospital, Mrs Munro accuses Holmes of caring for nothing but himself and his bees, and prepares to burn the apiary. Holmes stops her, having realised that the culprits are actually wasps; Roger had found a nearby nest and tried to flood it in order to protect the apiary, but the wasps swarmed on him instead. Holmes and Mrs Munro burn the nest together, then return to the hospital as Roger regains consciousness. As they sit in the waiting room, Holmes tells Mrs Munro that he was too fearful and selfish to open himself up to Ann Kelmot and to give her the comfort that she needed. He wants her and Roger to stay in his life, and tells her that they will inherit his estate after his death.

Back home, Holmes writes his first work of fiction: a letter to Umezaki, telling him that his father was a brave, honourable man who worked secretly and effectively for the British Empire. As Roger begins to teach his mother how to care for the bees, Holmes emulates a tradition he saw practised in Hiroshima: creating a ring of stones to serve as a place where he can recall the loved ones he has lost over the years.

Cast
 Ian McKellen as Sherlock Holmes
 Laura Linney as Mrs. Munro
 Milo Parker as Roger Munro
 Hiroyuki Sanada as Tamiki Umezaki
 Hattie Morahan as Ann Kelmot
 Patrick Kennedy as Thomas Kelmot
 Roger Allam as Dr. Barrie
 Phil Davis as Inspector Gilbert
 Frances de la Tour as Madame Schirmer
 Colin Starkey as Dr. John Watson
 Nicholas Rowe as "Matinee Sherlock"
 Frances Barber as "Matinee Madame Schirmer"
 John Sessions as Mycroft Holmes
 Sarah Crowden  as Mrs. Hudson
 Hermione Corfield as Matinee 'Ann Kelmot'.
 Kit Connor as "The boy"

Production
On 5 September 2013, it was announced that Mitch Cullin's 2005 book A Slight Trick of the Mind would be adapted into a film, with Ian McKellen as a long-retired Sherlock Holmes. Bill Condon was set to direct Jeffrey Hatcher's adaptation of the novel. AI-Film was on board to finance and co-produce the film, Anne Carey was set to produce through her Archer Gray Productions, Iain Canning and Emile Sherman would produce through See-Saw Films, and BBC Films would also co-finance the film. Filmnation Entertainment was set to handle the international sales for the film.

On 7 May 2014, Laura Linney and Hattie Morahan were added to the cast, with Linney set to play Mrs Munro, the housekeeper to Holmes. On 9 July Hiroyuki Sanada was added to the cast to play Matsuda Umezaki, a prickly ash plant enthusiast whom Holmes visits in Japan. On 10 July, more cast were revealed, including Patrick Kennedy, Roger Allam, Phil Davis, Frances de la Tour, with Milo Parker to play Mrs Munro's son. On 22 August it was revealed that Nicholas Rowe, who portrayed Holmes in the 1985 film Young Sherlock Holmes, would have a cameo role in the film. He portrays Holmes in a sequence spoofing the Basil Rathbone Sherlock Holmes films. On 3 September 2014, Miramax acquired distribution rights to the film in the United States with Roadside Attractions as partner.

Filming
Principal photography began on 5 July 2014 in the United Kingdom. On 9 July, McKellen tweeted a picture of himself as Sherlock Holmes in the film. The film was set for a seven-week shoot on location in London and on the south coast of England. The production also filmed at The Historic Dockyard Chatham which doubled as streets in Japan.

Music
Carter Burwell composed the music for the film. The soundtrack was released on 28 August 2015.

Copyright Dispute
The Conan Doyle Estate filed legal action against the creators of the film on May 21, 2015, alleging unauthorized copying of copyrighted stories by Arthur Conan Doyle that cover the later life of Sherlock  Holmes. All parties reached an agreement out of court before the release of the film in the United States, and later editions of the novel on which the film is based now include a note thanking the estate for permission to use copyrighted material.

Release
The film had its premiere at the 65th Berlin International Film Festival on February 7, 2015. It was released in British cinemas on 19 June 2015 and in the United States on 17 July 2015. It was released on DVD and Blu-ray on 13 October 2015.

Reception
According to the review aggregator website Rotten Tomatoes, 88% of critics have given the film a positive review based on 187 reviews, with an average rating of 7.10/10. The site's critics consensus reads, "Mr. Holmes focuses on the man behind the mysteries, and while it may lack Baker Street thrills, it more than compensates with tenderly wrought, well-acted drama." At Metacritic, the film has a weighted average score of 67 out of 100 based on 35 critics, indicating "generally favorable reviews". Audiences polled by CinemaScore gave the film an average grade of "A−" on an A+ to F scale.

IGN awarded it a score of 7.7 out of 10, saying "Gentle, moving, diverting drama that's perfect Sunday afternoon fare".

Accolades

References

External links
 

Sherlock Holmes films
2015 films
2010s crime drama films
2010s historical films
2010s mystery films
British historical films
British crime drama films
British mystery films
American crime drama films
American mystery films
2010s English-language films
Films about old age
Films based on American novels
Films directed by Bill Condon
Films set in 1947
Films set in Sussex
Films set in England
Films set in Japan
Films shot in England
BBC Film films
FilmNation Entertainment films
Films scored by Carter Burwell
Roadside Attractions films
Films produced by Anne Carey
2015 drama films
Japan in non-Japanese culture
Icon Productions films
2010s American films
2010s British films